Harriet Lee may refer to:

 Harriet Lee (singer) (fl. 1925–1973), American singer and voice coach
 Harriet Lee (swimmer) (born 1991), British Paralympic swimmer
 Harriet Lee (writer) (1757–1851), English novelist and playwright